This is a list of archaeological sites in Bangladesh:

Dhaka Division
 Sat Gambuj Mosque
 Khan Mohammad Mridha Mosque
 Bara Katra
 Lalbagh Fort
 Chhota Katra
 Shahbaz Khan Mosque
 Musa Khan Mosque
 Northbrook Hall
 Ruplal House
 Rose Garden Palace
 Bhajahari Lodge
 Panam Nagar
 Sonakanda Fort
 Hajiganj Fort
 Baliati Zamindari
 Idrakpur Fort
 Baba Adam's Mosque
 Wari-Bateshwar ruins
 Pathrail Mosque

Chittagong Division
 Shalban Vihara
 Bariura Old Bridge

Sylhet Division
 Ghayebi Dighi Masjid
 Shankarpasha Shahi Masjid

Barisal Division 

 Nasrat Gazi Mosque
 Qasba Mosque
 Mahilara Sarkar Math
 Kamalapur Mosque
 Miah Bari Mosque
 Bibi Chini Mosque
 Collectorate Bhaban, Barishal

Rajshahi Division
 Bagha Mosque
 Kismat Maria Mosque
 Bara Anhik Mandir
 Puthia Rajbari
 Chota Anhik Mandir
 Pancha Ratna Shiva Temple
 Dol-Mandir
 Pancha Ratna Govinda Temple
 Somapura Mahavihara
 Halud Vihara
 Kusumba Mosque
 Jagaddala Mahavihara
 Uttara Ganabhaban
 Natore Rajbari
 Choto Sona Mosque
 Darasbari Mosque
 Mughal Tahakhana
 Rohanpur Octagonal Tomb
 Mahasthangarh
 Gokul Medh
 Vasu Vihara
 Mangalkot (ancient sculpture)

Rangpur Division
 Kantajew Temple

Khulna Division
 Sixty Dome Mosque
 Nine Dome Mosque
 Singar Mosque
 Mound of Dam Dam Peer
 Masjidkur
 Rabindra Complex
 Tetulia Jami Mosque

References

Archaeology of Bangladesh
Bangladesh
Archaeological sites